Pir Hoseyni (also Romanized as Pīr Ḩoseynī) is a village in Doshman Ziari Rural District, Doshman Ziari District, Mamasani County, Fars Province, Iran. At the 2006 census, its population was 85, in 19 families.

References 

Populated places in Mamasani County